Syed Najmuddin Hashim (1925-1999) was a Bangladeshi journalist, politician, and writer.

Early life
Hashim was born on 1 June 1925 in Dhaka, East Bengal, British Raj. In 1942, he graduated from St Gregory's High School and from  Dhaka Intermediate College in 1944. In 1946 he graduated with a B.A. in English from Presidency College Calcutta.

Career
Hashim started his career as a journalist. From 1948 to 1962 he worked in Radio Pakistan including as Editor and Broadcaster. From 1962 to 1964 he worked in the Industrial Development Bank as the Chief Public Relations Officer. From 1966 to 1968 he was the Deputy Director of Bureau of National Research and Reconstruction. From 1968 to 1970, he was the First Secretary at the Pakistan Embassy in France. From 1970 to 1972, Hashim was the Executive Director of Pakistan Council. From 1974 to 1975 he served as the Managing Director of Bangladesh Film Development Corporation after which he was appointed Joint Secretary to the Ministry of Information.

From 1975 to 1979, Hashim served as a Director General at the Ministry of Foreign Affairs. From 1979 to 1980, he was stationed in the Bangladesh High Commission in London as the Press Minister.  From 1980 to 1982, he was the High Commissioner of Bangladesh to Singapore and the Ambassador to Myanmar. He was the Minister of Information of Bangladesh from 1982 to 1984 in the cabinet of President of Hussain Mohammad Ershad. From 1984 to 1986 he was the Bangladesh Ambassador to USSR with accreditation as ambassador to Finland and Mongolia.

Bibliography
He wrote a number of non-fiction books about the history and politics of Bangladesh, some were published posthumously.
 Bandishala Pakistan (1994)
 Ashleshar Rakshasi Belai: Smritipate Sheikh Mujib O Anyanya (1996)
 Samudyata Daiva Durbipakey (1999)
 The Devottee, the Combatant: Selected Poems of Shamsur Rahman (2000)
 Hopefully the Pomegranate (2007)

Death
Hashim died on 18 August 1999 in Dhaka, Bangladesh.

References

1925 births
1999 deaths
Bangladeshi diplomats
High Commissioners of Bangladesh to Singapore
Ambassadors of Bangladesh to Myanmar
Ambassadors of Bangladesh to Finland
Ambassadors of Bangladesh to Mongolia
Ambassadors of Bangladesh to USSR
Bangladeshi male writers
20th-century Bangladeshi writers
People from Dhaka
Presidency University, Kolkata alumni
Dhaka College alumni
Bangladeshi civil servants
Bangladeshi journalists
Bangladeshi politicians
St. Gregory's High School and College alumni